Commander Abraham Whipple (September 26, 1733 – May 27, 1819) was an American naval officer best known for his service in the Continental Navy during the Revolutionary War and being one of the founders of Marietta, Ohio. Born near Providence, Colony of Rhode Island, Whipple chose to be a seafarer early in his life and embarked on a career in the lucrative trade with the West Indies, working for Moses and John Brown. In the French and Indian War period, he became a privateersman and commanded privateer Game Cock from 1759 to 1760. In one six-month cruise, he captured 23 French ships.

In 1772, Whipple burnt the first British naval casualty of the American Revolution, the revenue cutter Gaspee, in the Gaspée Affair. The first to unfurl the Star Spangled Banner in London, Whipple was also the first to sail an ocean-going ship 2000 miles downriver from Ohio to the Caribbean, which opened trade with the Northwest Territory.  Abraham Whipple was a member of the Society of the Cincinnati of the State of Rhode Island.

Early life

Abraham Whipple was born on September 26, 1733, to Noah Whipple Jr. Abraham Whipple and Sarah Hopkins were married on August 2, 1761. They had three children: John, Catherine, and Mary. Catherine later married Colonel Ebenezer Sproat of the Continental Army. Whipple sold enslaved people as part of his mercantile career; on November 1763, Whipple sold an enslaved woman named Deuse to Nicholas Brown & Co.

Revolutionary activities

Rhode Island
As American colonists began to express their opposition to the policies of the Crown, acts of defiance became increasingly prevalent. An early incident occurred on June 9, 1772, when Whipple led 50 Rhode Islanders in the capture and burning of the British revenue cutter Gaspee. The ship had run aground off Pawtuxet while chasing the packet Hannah.  The burning initiated an exchange of notes between Whipple and Captain James Wallace of HMS Rose.  Wallace wrote, "You Abraham Whipple on June 10, 1772, burned his majesty's vessel the Gaspee and I will hang you at the yard arm!" Whipple responded, "Sir, always catch a man before you hang him."

Three years later, the Rhode Island General Assembly appointed Whipple commodore of two ships fitted for the defense of the colony's trade. On June 15, 1775, (the day the sea captain received his commission), Whipple led his men to capture the tender to frigate HMS Rose. After cruising in the vicinity of Narragansett Bay, he headed south to Bermuda to procure gunpowder for use by the colony. On the return voyage, Whipple transported naval recruits to Philadelphia. Upon her arrival there, his ship, Katy, was taken over by agents of the Continental Congress and was fitted out as sloop-of-war Providence.

Naval command

Whipple was commissioned a captain in the Continental Navy on December 22 and was given command of 24-gun ship Columbus. From February 17 to April 8, 1776, he commanded the ship during the first Continental Navy-Marine Corps amphibious expedition—the cruise to New Providence, in the Bahamas, to seize essential military supplies from the British garrison at Nassau.

After returning north to New England, Whipple captured five British prizes before March 27, 1778, when his ship ran aground off Point Judith, Rhode Island. After stripping the ship, the captain and his crew abandoned her and escaped capture ashore.

Assigned next to command 28-gun frigate Providence, Whipple ran the British blockade on the night of April 30, 1778, damaging HMS Lark and outrunning another British ship during the escape. Tacking for France, the Providence crossed the Atlantic Ocean unmolested, bearing important dispatches relating to agreements between France and the American colonies, and reached Paimboeuf. After acquiring guns and supplies for the Continental Army, the Providence and the Boston sailed home to the colonies, taking three prizes en route.

Upon his return, Whipple received command of a small squadron—Providence, Ranger, and Queen of France. On one occasion in mid-July 1779, this group of ships encountered a large British convoy in dense fog off the Newfoundland Banks. Whipple concealed his guns and ran up the British flag. Thus disguised, Whipple cut 11 prizes out of the convoy, eight of which contained spoils of war valued together at over one million dollars (roughly 16.7 million in 2015 dollars), making the venture easily one of the richest captures of the entire war.

Whipple then cruised off Bermuda before arriving at Charleston, South Carolina. On December 23, 1779. British forces threatened Charleston, which was at the time a key Continental port. The threat led Whipple to move the guns and crews from the Continental Navy ships in port on shore to reinforce the land batteries and repulse the expected British assault.

However, after a rugged four-month siege, the overwhelming pressure of British arms forced the Continental forces to surrender on May 12, 1780. Whipple remained a prisoner of war of the British until he was paroled to Chester, Pennsylvania, at which point he took no further part in the war. Upon the conclusion of hostilities, Whipple took up farming near Cranston, Rhode Island.

Later life

For the rest of his life, he remained a farmer, with the exception of two spells of seafaring as master of merchantmen, first of the General Washington and then of the St. Clair. With the formation of the Ohio Company of Associates in 1788 and the initial westward migration into that territory, Whipple and his family became pioneers on the American frontier and were among the founders of the town of Marietta, Ohio, and the first named proprietor of Charleston, Vermont.

Granted a pension by Congress in recognition of his distinguished service in helping to win American independence, Whipple died at Marietta, Ohio, on May 27, 1819, and was buried at Mound Cemetery in Marietta. His gravestone reads:

Sacred to the memory of Commodore Abraham Whipple whose naval skill and courage will ever remain the pride and boast of his country. In the revolution he was the first on the seas to hurl defiance at proud Britain, gallantly leading the way to wrest from the mistress of the ocean her scepter, and there to wave the star spangled banner. He also conducted to the sea the first square rigged vessel built on the Ohio, opening to commerce resources beyond calculation. Born September 26th, A.D. 1733. Died May 27th, 1819. Aged 85 years.

Several ships of the United States Navy have been named USS Whipple in his honor. There is a Whipple Street, Avenue or Court in almost every one of the 39 municipalities in the State of Rhode Island.

Fictional references
 In The Case of Charles Dexter Ward by H.P. Lovecraft, Capt. Abraham Whipple, one of the "eminent townsmen" of Providence, Rhode Island, led the raid on Joseph Curwen's farm. He is also mentioned in "The Shunned House" as a cousin of the narrator's great-grandfather. Whipple was an indirect ancestor of Lovecraft's, through his grandfather Whipple Van Buren Phillips.

References

Bibliography
 Cohen, Sheldon S.:  Commodore Abraham Whipple of the Continental Navy: Privateer, Patriot, Pioneer, University Press of Florida, Series: New Perspectives on Maritime History and Nautical Archaeology, Gainesville, Florida (2010).
 Hildreth, S. P.: Biographical and Historical Memoirs of the Early Pioneer Settlers of Ohio, H. W. Derby and Co., Cincinnati, Ohio (1852).

External links

 The Whipple Website
 The Gaspee Virtual Archives

1733 births
1819 deaths
Continental Navy officers
People of Rhode Island in the American Revolution
American Revolutionary War prisoners of war held by Great Britain
American slave traders
People from Marietta, Ohio
Burials at Mound Cemetery (Marietta, Ohio)
Patriots in the American Revolution
People from Providence, Rhode Island
Burials in Ohio
People of colonial Rhode Island
People of the French and Indian War